
Janq'u Quta (Aymara janq'u white, quta lake, "white lake", hispanicized spelling Janko Kota) is a lake in the Cordillera Real in the Andes of Bolivia. It is located in the La Paz Department, Larecaja Province, in the south-west of the Guanay Municipality. Janq'u Quta lies near the mountain Ch'iyar Juqhu.
Lake can be reached from village Chajolpaya,  Municipio Sorata, Provincia Larecaja, La Paz, Bolivia.

See also 
 Kuntur Jipiña

References 

Lakes of La Paz Department (Bolivia)